John Wheeley Lea (8 May 1791 – 23 March 1874) was an English pharmacist, sauce manufacturer and company co-founder

Biography
Lea was born on a farm in Feckenham, Worcestershire, England and had three brothers and four sisters, he aspired to be a chemist as a young child. In 1823 he partnered with William Henry Perrins, opening a drug store in Worcester, and  establishing company Lea & Perrins and in 1837 began selling there brand of Worcestershire sauce.

Lea was also an alderman and was elected Mayor of Worcester in 1874 but served only three months in office. He died of acute dyspepsia (a fatal stomach disorder where the stomach cannot function properly) on 23 March 1874 at Stanfield House, Upper Wick, Worcestershire, and was buried in the family tomb at St Peter's, Powick.

Notes

1791 births
1874 deaths
English chemists
Mayors of places in Worcestershire
19th-century English people
People from Redditch (district)
19th-century British businesspeople
Burials in Worcestershire